mHUB is an innovation center for physical product development and manufacturing headquartered in Chicago. Located in West Town, Chicago, mHUB is a co-working community of product designers and developers, entrepreneurs, engineers and manufacturers, a network of manufacturing mentors, industry experts and investors, and a source of intellectual and economic capital. Since 2017, mHUB has supported over 350 startups, developed 900 products and attracted over $320 million in investments. mHUB offers membership options for early-stage entrepreneurs and established enterprises. All members have access to mentorship, community events, affiliate discounts and classes.

Facility 
mHUB's facility is in the former Motorola Mobility (a Lenovo company) prototyping and testing lab, which covers 63,000 square feet and is home to over 10 labs for prototyping and manufacturing. Labs include: 3D Printer Lab, Cold Metals Lab, Electronics Lab, Finishing Lab, Hot Metals Lab, Laser Cutting Lab, Plastics Lab, Testing Lab, Textiles Lab, Water Work Lab, and Woodworking Lab. There is more than $2.5 million of equipment for members of the community. mHUB has over 5,000 square feet of event space where it organizes and hosts more than 300 events a year.

Partners
mHUB's founding partner is Marmon, and its leading partners are: Arrow Electronics, Chamberlain Group, Chase, The U.S. Economic Development Administration, GE, Kirkland & Ellis, UL and World Business Chicago.

Founding 
Catalyze, a coworking hub, World Business Chicago, and Mayor Rahm Emanuel kickstarted mHUB in early 2017 after a meeting between Emanuel and manufacturers determined that an incubator was necessary to drive manufacturing talent in the region. The non-profit 501(c)(3) organization opened on March 2, 2017, and was co-founded by Haven Allen, CEO, and Bill Fienup, Director of Innovation Services. Mayor Rahm Emanuel called the project "the final piece of the manufacturing puzzle".

mHUB Accelerated Incubation   
mHUB Accelerated Incubation is a six-month, hands-on startup accelerator focused on the product development and commercialization of early-stage, high-potential hardtech startups. The mHUB accelerator will focus on six cohort groups in the following industries: Industrial Internet of Things (IIoT), medical devices, connected buildings and home, communication technologies, smart cities, smart mobility and energy technology. The first cohort focused on IIoT technologies, supported by corporate partners AVNET and Panduit, began in 2021.

mHUB Product Impact Fund I 
mHUB's Product Impact Fund I is a $15M venture fund that will invest in 60 early-stage physical product and hardtech ventures with deployment from 2020 To 2023. The Fund supports cohorts of the mHUB accelerator program and will make seed-stage investments of $75,000 cash and $56,750 in product development, resources and programming for 5% equity with pro rata rights.

Grants & Funding 
mHUB is a recipient of the following grants: 

 “Scaling Hardtech Development Services” $1.3M grant from the Economic Development Administration – September 2020, Venture Challenge Scale
 “Chicago Proactive Response COVID-19 Economic Recovery” $2.8M grant from the Economic Development Administration – May 2021, CARES Economic Adjustment Assistance  
 “mHUB Innovation Center & Accelerator” $50K grant from the Department of Energy – October 2020, Energy Program for Innovation Clusters #1 
 “Midwest Regional Innovation Partnership” - $1M grant from the Department of Energy – June 2021, Energy Program for Innovation Cluster #2 
 “Clean Tech Economic Coalition” - $500K grant from Economic Development Administration -December 2021 Build Back Better Regional Challenge

References 

2017 establishments in Illinois
Organizations established in 2017
Product development
Innovation organizations
Business and industry organizations based in Chicago
Manufacturing in the United States